The Platino Award for Best Director (Spanish: Premio Platino al mejor director / Premio Platino a la mejor dirección) is one of the Platino Awards, Ibero-America's film awards presented annually by the Entidad de Gestión de Derechos de los Productores Audiovisuales (EGEDA) and the Federación Iberoamericana de Productores Cinematográficos y Audiovisuales (FIPCA). 

It was first presented at the 1st Platino Awards, where Mexican director Amat Escalante was the first recipient of the award for the film Heli. Spanish director Pedro Almodóvar is the only director who has won the award more than once with two wins, in 2017 for Julieta and in 2020 for Pain and Glory. Almodovar is also the most nominated director in the category with three nominations followed by Sebastián Lelio, Álvaro Brechner, Ciro Guerra, Pablo Larraín and Icíar Bollaín, all with two nominations each.

In the list below the winner of the award for each year is shown first, followed by the other nominees.

Awards and nominations

2010s

2020s

See also
 Latin American television awards

References

External links
Official site

Director
Awards for best director